Costa Rica competed at the 2012 Summer Olympics in London from 27 July to 12 August 2012. This was the nation's fourteenth appearance at the Olympics, excluding four occasions from its national debut in 1936.

Comité Olímpico de Costa Rica sent a total of 11 athletes to the Games, 8 men and 3 women, to compete in 6 sports. Three of its athletes made their second consecutive Olympic appearance, including marathon runner Gabriela Traña, who was also the nation's flag bearer at the opening ceremony. Costa Rica, however, failed to win a single Olympic medal for the third consecutive time.

Athletics

Costa Rican athletes have so far achieved qualifying standards in the following athletics events (up to a maximum of 3 athletes in each event at the 'A' Standard, and 1 at the 'B' Standard):

Key
 Note – Ranks given for track events are within the athlete's heat only
 Q = Qualified for the next round
 q = Qualified for the next round as a fastest loser or, in field events, by position without achieving the qualifying target
 NR = National record
 N/A = Round not applicable for the event
 Bye = Athlete not required to compete in round

Men

Women

Cycling

Road

Mountain biking

Judo

Swimming

Men

Women

Taekwondo

Costa Rica qualified one man.

Triathlon

Costa Rica qualified the following athletes.

References

Nations at the 2012 Summer Olympics
2012
Summer Olympics